Liga Națională (Romanian for "National League") can refer to the following:
Liga Națională (men's basketball), the top-tier professional basketball league of Romania
Liga Națională (women's basketball), the top-tier women's professional basketball league of Romania
Liga Națională (men's handball), the top-tier men's team handball league in Romania
Liga Națională (women's handball), the top-tier women's team handball league in Romania
Liga Națională de hochei, the Romanian Hockey League